The Swedish Women's Hockey League, abbreviated SDHL, is the elite league for women's ice hockey in Sweden. The league has ten teams and employs a system of promotion and relegation with the Damettan. The unexpected withdrawal of Göteborg HC after playing only thirteen games of the 2022–23 season caused the number of teams to decrease to nine for the remainder of that season.

Bodychecking was allowed for the 2022–23 season.

Format 
When a game is tied after regulation, a sudden death overtime is played with only four skaters per team for maximum 10 minutes (or 20 minutes in the playoffs). If the game is still tied after overtime, the winner is decided by game winning shots.

The regular season is a double round-robin tournament, with each team playing twice at home and twice away against every other team, resulting in a 36-game regular season per team. After the regular season, the top six teams qualify for the Women's Swedish Championship playoffs. The two teams with the best regular season records in the SDHL are given a bye to the semifinals, with the remaining four qualified teams starting in the quarterfinals. In the quarterfinals, team 3 gets to pick their choice of opponent between teams 5 and 6, leaving the remaining club to meet team 4. In the semifinals the first ranked team chooses an opponent from the two winners of the quarterfinals. The playoffs are all best-of-three series, with the higher ranked team starting with one match away, followed by the remaining two at home.

The two teams with the worst records in the regular season are forced to play a qualifier to defend their spots in the SDHL against challengers from Damettan.

Teams 

From the formation of the SDHL in 2007, Luleå HF/MSSK have been the most successful club, winning five Swedish Championships. Luleå has been the most successful regular season team, finishing on top of the league five times. Modo Hockey Dam was the first team from outside the Stockholm area to win the championship with their victory in 2012.

2022–23 teams 

Sources:

Previous winners

Regular season champions 

 2008 – AIK Hockey
 2009 – Segeltorps IF
 2010 – Segeltorps IF
 2011 – Segeltorps IF
 2012 – Brynäs IF
 2013 – Modo Hockey
 2014 – Modo Hockey
 2015 – Linköping HC

 2016 – Luleå HF/MSSK
 2017 – Luleå HF/MSSK
 2018 – Luleå HF/MSSK
 2019 – Luleå HF/MSSK
 2020 – HV71
 2021 – Luleå HF/MSSK
 2022 – Brynäs IF

Swedish Champions (playoff winners) 

 2008 – Segeltorps IF
 2009 – AIK Hockey Dam
 2010 – Segeltorps IF
 2011 – Segeltorps IF
 2012 – Modo Hockey
 2013 – AIK Hockey Dam
 2014 – Linköping HC
 2015 – Linköping HC

 2016 – Luleå HF/MSSK
 2017 – Djurgårdens IF
 2018 – Luleå HF/MSSK
 2019 – Luleå HF/MSSK
 2020 – Not held due to COVID-19 pandemic
 2021 – Luleå HF/MSSK
 2022 – Luleå HF/MSSK
 2023 – Luleå HF/MSSK

Attendance 
While average attendance in the SDHL has been significantly lower than other professional leagues in Sweden and the Premier Hockey Federation in North America, attendance has tended towards increasing as the league receives greater investment and promotion, and as women's clubs have been less neglected by their parent organisations. There exists a considerable disparity in attendance between clubs, with Luleå HF/MSSK having led the league in attendance ever single year since the club's formation, often with almost ten time greater attendance than the worst attended club. Playoff attendance has also tended to be much higher than regular season attendance, averaging almost 900 per match in 2017–18 and 2018–19.

League records

Individual records 
 Most goals in a season: Andrea Dalen, 47 goals (36 games, 2015–16)
 Most assists in a season: Lara Stalder, 55 assists (33 games, 2021–22)
 Most points in a season: Lara Stalder, 89 points (33 games, 2021–22)
 Most points in a season, defenceman: Sidney Morin, 65 points (36 games, 2020–21) 
 Most penalty minutes in a season: Jenn Wakefield, 90 PIM (31 games, 2020–21)
 Most shutouts in a season: Florence Schelling, 10 shutouts (31 games, 2017–18)
 Best save percentage in a season, minimum 1/3 of games played: Kim Martin Hasson, .956 (17 games, 2014–15)
 Beat goals against average in a season, minimum 1/3 of games played: Kim Martin Hasson, 1.06 GAA (17 games, 2014–15)

Club records 
 Most points in a season: 99, HV71 in 2019–20
 Highest attendance in a regular season match: 6,220 – Luleå HF/MSSK vs. AIK Hockey, 16 November 2018 
 Highest attendance in a playoff match: 7,765 – Brynäs IF vs. Luleå HF/MSSK at Monitor ERP Arena, 7 April 2022 (Game 5 of the 2022 Swedish Championship finals)

All-time leading scorers 
The top-ten point-scorers (goals + assists) in SDHL history.

Note: Nat = Nationality; Pos = Position; GP = Games played; G = Goals; A = Assists; Pts = Points; P/G = Points per game

Source:

See also 
 Women's ice hockey in Sweden
 List of SDHL seasons
 Sweden women's national ice hockey team
 Swedish Ice Hockey Association

References

External links 
  
 
 
 
 

Swedish Women's Hockey League
Sweden
Women's ice hockey competitions in Sweden
2008 establishments in Sweden
Sports leagues established in 2008
Women's sports leagues in Sweden
Professional ice hockey leagues in Sweden
Women's ice hockey in Sweden